Football Mogul is a series of sports-simulation games that allows a player to play the owner, head coach or general manager of a National Football League (pro American football) franchise. The most recent version is Football Mogul 21.

The original Football Mogul was released on March 30, 1999, a year after the release of the first Baseball Mogul.

Games

See also

 List of simulation video games

References

National Football League video games
Sports management video games
Sports Mogul
Video game franchises
Video game franchises introduced in 1999
Windows games